= Thailand national football team results =

This article details the fixtures and results of the Thailand national football team.

== See also ==
- Thailand national football team head-to-head record
- Thailand women's national football team results
